Acmaeoderoides is a genus of beetles in the family Buprestidae, containing the following species:

 Acmaeoderoides cazieri Nelson, 1968
 Acmaeoderoides confusus Nelson, 1999
 Acmaeoderoides depressus Nelson, 1968
 Acmaeoderoides distinctus Nelson, 1968
 Acmaeoderoides ferruginis Wellso & Nelson in Nelson, 1968
 Acmaeoderoides humeralis (Cazier, 1938)
 Acmaeoderoides insignis (Horn, 1894)
 Acmaeoderoides knulli Nelson, 1968
 Acmaeoderoides rossi (Cazier, 1937)
 Acmaeoderoides rufescens Nelson, 1968
 Acmaeoderoides stramineus Nelson, 1968
 Acmaeoderoides verityi Nelson, 1968

References

Buprestidae genera